The Representative Party of Alberta (first registered as the Political Alternative Association, and known as the Alternative Government Movement prior to registration in 1984) was a provincial political party in Alberta, Canada formed by former Alberta Social Credit Party parliamentary leader Raymond Speaker in 1984. The party was populist and conservative in ideology, and considered a modern version of the Canadian social credit movement without the social credit monetary reform policy.

History

Foundation
Prior to the 1982 Alberta provincial election, Speaker and another longtime Alberta Social Credit Party Socred MLA, Walt Buck, left the party and ran as Independents due to a collapse of their party and problems with organisation and leadership. The two MLAs were successfully returned as Independents to the Legislative Assembly of Alberta. After election they tried to form the official opposition over but were denied by the Speaker of the Assembly who gave the two-member Alberta New Democratic Party the official opposition status.

After being denied party funding, Speaker and Buck floated the idea for a new political party in 1982.

The two MLAs set about trying to create a new party which began taking root in the spring of 1984. They began holding meetings across the province which they promoted under the name Alternate Government Movement. The party also hired Preston Manning as a  political consultant to present draft policies at its founding meetings.

The founding convention for the party was held on 23 and 24 November in Red Deer. The party selected a board of directors and elected Ray Speaker as leader by acclamation. It also selected the name Representative Party of Alberta from four options. The other three options were United Party, Free Democratic Party and the Free Citizens Alliance Party. The paperwork submitted to Elections Alberta and petitions of registration that had started before the convention were under the Political Alternative Association name. The party planned to submit a request to change the name as soon as registration was accepted by Elections Alberta. On 7 January 1985 Elections Alberta accepted the petition after it collected the signatures of over 4500 Alberta electors.

Collapse of the Alberta Political Alliance
In 1985 the Social Credit Party, the Western Canada Concept and Heritage Party of Alberta began a merger movement that resulted in the Alberta Alliance Political Association.

The merger was short-lived and broke apart, collapsing the parties involved. Many candidates and supporters moved to support the Representative Party which became the primary right-wing alternative party for that election.

1986 provincial election
In the 1986 provincial election, the Representative Party ran 46 candidates in Alberta’s 83 ridings, but only its two founding MLAs were elected. The party received 36,656 votes, or 5.1% of the popular vote.

The final years of the party
After marginal success of the party in the 1986 election, Walt Buck retired and Raymond Speaker ended up crossing the floor to the Alberta Progressive Conservative Party. The Representative Party remained registered but did not run candidates in the 1989 election.
It was disbanded a short time later

References

See also
Representative Party of Ontario
List of Alberta political parties

Provincial political parties in Alberta
Political parties established in 1984
Political parties disestablished in 1989
Defunct political parties in Canada
1984 establishments in Alberta
1988 disestablishments in Alberta